Darsajin Rural District is in the Central District of Abhar County, Zanjan province, Iran. At the National Census of 2006, its population was 2,099 in 611 households. There were 1,796 inhabitants in 558 households at the following census of 2011. At the most recent census of 2016, the population of the rural district was 1,197 in 455 households. The largest of its 19 villages was Darsajin, with 320 people. The language of the people is Persian, which is also known as the Lori  dialect.

References 

Abhar County

Rural Districts of Zanjan Province

Populated places in Zanjan Province

Populated places in Abhar County